Stories to Tell is the fifth studio album released by singer-songwriter Dave Barnes.  A lot like his older albums, Stories To Tell has a mix of pop, country, rock, and soul.  The album was recorded in Los Angeles and was the first time Barnes has recorded an album outside of his hometown of Nashville.  The producer of the album was John Fields.  Fields has produced with other bands including Lifehouse, Switchfoot, Goo Goo Dolls, and Pink. This was his fourth release on Razor & Tie record label, his previous release, What We Want, What We Get, was a success.

Reception
Within a week of the album being released, it was already #11 on the iTunes top Singer/Songwriter page.  On March 31, 2012, the album was #59 on the Billboard 200 chart.

Track listing
 "White Flag" – 3:23
 "How Long" – 3:02
 "Mine To Love" – 3:45
 "Heaven Help Me" – 2:56
 "Love Will Be Enough For Us" – 3:45
 "Seventeen" – 3:41
 "Missing You" – 3:21
 "Find Your Way Home" – 3:00
 "Stories To Tell" – 3:27
 "Warm Heart In a Cold World" – 4:09
 "One of Us" – 3:47
 "Baby Needs New Shoes" – 3:22 (iTunes exclusive)

References

Dave Barnes albums
2012 albums